Ouanaham Airport  is an airport serving Lifou, Lifou Island, New Caledonia.

Airlines and destinations

Statistics

References

Lifou